Soul's Aflame is the second album released by O.A.R. in 1999, recorded at Gizmo Recording Company in Silver Spring, Maryland with engineer and producer, Gantt Kushner.

Track listing
 "City on Down" – 3:53
 "Untitled" – 5:24
 "So Moved On" – 5:54
 "Night Shift" – 2:59
 "Ran Away to the Top of the World Today" – 6:01
 "On Top the Cage" – 6:03
 "The Wanderer" – 6:02
 "When Can I Go Home?" – 5:24
 "To Zion Goes I" – 4:11
 "Hey Girl" - 4:36
 "I Feel Home" - 4:03

 The album was originally released with a twelfth track, entitled "Earthward", which was later removed. Earthward was originally the 7th track of the album.

Personnel
O. A. R.
Marc Roberge - rhythm guitar, lead vocals
Chris Culos - drums
Richard On - lead guitar, background vocals on track eight
Benj Gershman - bass

Additional musicians
Jerry DePizzo - saxophone on tracks one and 10
Miles Goldstein - harmonica on track 10

1999 albums
O.A.R. albums